6F or 6-F can refer to:

 Six Flags amusement parks
 Ford 6F transmission; see GM-Ford 6-speed automatic transmission
 A-6F, a model of Grumman A-6 Intruder
 Grumman F6F Hellcat
 Sucrose 6F-alpha-galactosyltransferase
 Cunningham-Hall Model PT-6F, a model of Cunningham-Hall PT-6
 ER-6f, an alternate name for the Kawasaki Ninja 650R
 6F, the production code for the 1983 Doctor Who serial Mawdryn Undead

See also
F6 (disambiguation)